Khiladi is a 1992 Indian Hindi-language action thriller film directed by Abbas–Mustan. The film was produced by Girish Jain and Champak Jain under the banner of Venus Records and Tapes. The film was Akshay Kumar's breakthrough role and also stars Ayesha Jhulka, Deepak Tijori and Sabeeha, while Prem Chopra, Shakti Kapoor, Anant Mahadevan and Johnny Lever played supporting roles.

Khiladi was the first installment in a series of unrelated films which had Khiladi in the title and Akshay Kumar in the leading role:  Main Khiladi Tu Anari (1994), Sabse Bada Khiladi (1995), Khiladiyon Ka Khiladi (1996), Mr. and Mrs. Khiladi (1997), International Khiladi (1999), Khiladi 420 (2000) and Khiladi 786 (2012). The core plot was reported to be a rehash of the 1975 superhit movie Khel Khel Mein.

Plot
Raj Malhotra, Boney, Neelam Chaudhary and Sheetal are four college pranksters. Raj is the younger brother of Inspector Suresh Malhotra; Boney probably has no relatives; Sheetal is the daughter of wealthy Kailashnath; Neelam is a rich heiress with her uncle as her only living relative. Raj and Neelam, as well as Boney and Sheetal fall for each other.

Raj is a habitual gambler, who has yet to lose, but when he bets that he can extort money from Kailashnath, the gang gets skeptical but agrees to help him. As per the bet, they trick Kailashnath into believing that Sheetal is kidnapped, while in reality, they have housed themselves in a cottage outside Bombay belonging to Pillai. When Raj makes the bet, he decides that Boney will pose as a kidnapper with him. Raj puts his plan into action and Kailashnath gets panicked and decides to not to alert the cops. However, one of his aides becomes suspicious. On deciding that Sheetal has been kidnapped, Suresh is saddled with the case. Learning this, the group panics. Kailashnath, however, delivers the money, ignorant of the development. Raj and Boney recover the money and go to meet the still skeptical females. Neelam sees them coming and goes to receive them. She is surprised to see the money and the trio calls Sheetal.

Sheetal arrives with a strange look on her face and collapses dead, revealing a knife in her back. The gang is taken aback by this unexpected development, but quickly recovers and hides Sheetal's body before anyone gets a scent. They successfully evade the suspicions of Suresh and finally manage to hide Sheetal's body in the decklid of a car parked in a theatre parking. Sheetal's body is found, and her kidnappers become prime suspects. Meanwhile, some strange developments are taking place: a dancer named Julie blackmails Kailashnath. It is revealed that Julie is a well-known dancer, but has been blackmailing Kailash for quite some time.

She asks a hefty amount; Kailashnath refuses where Julie threatens and tells him to attend a dance show she has arranged. There, Kailashnath is supposed to give her the money as a prize. Neelam gets a surprise when her uncle shows up to see how she is doing. Coincidentally, he is going to attend the function too. Raj and Boney decide to participate. On learning about Julie's meeting with Kailashnath, Suresh thinks that there is more to the case than it appears. Boney gets on stage to dance with Julie and in the middle of the dance, recognises her as the woman, who nearly killed them.

Realising that those accidents were more than a coincidence, he decides to confront her after the show. After the show, Neelam goes to her hostel while Raj goes home. Meanwhile, Suresh becomes confident that the trio is involved in the case. He confronts Raj, who tells the truth. Here, Boney comes to meet Julie, only to see her dressing room door is locked. He hears some voices and peeps through a keyhole.

Julie is with a man whom Boney is unable to see. Boney's suspicion proves correct, Julie tells the man that she tried to kill the gang on his orders. She blackmails the man, too, and he kills her. At this point, Boney sees the killer and flees. The killer is alerted of Boney's presence and sends goons to kill him. Raj and Suresh try to find Boney after they realise that he is missing. Meanwhile, Boney is stabbed and about to be killed by the goons when the brothers arrive. After Raj single-handedly takes on the goons, Boney tells him that Neelam is in danger before becoming unconscious.

Raj calls Neelam and alerts her; the phone gets suddenly disconnected. He rushes to her hostel with Suresh. Neelam is alone in the hostel and is horrified to find that the watchman is already dead. Meanwhile, Raj tells the truth to Suresh. Neelam gets attacked by the killer. She doesn't get to see his face but is able to defend herself. She succeeds in throwing him out of the window, thinking that he is dead. As she is gasping for breath, she is shocked to find that the killer is actually her uncle.

He tries to kill her. Raj and Suresh arrive in time to arrest him. While in interrogation room, he reveals that he is not Neelam's uncle. He is the manager of her estate, who was given her custody by her dying father, as Neelam had no other living relatives. He thought that he would get at least some part of the estate as her guardian, but her father's will revealed that when she turns 18, he will lose all the estate to her. According to another clause, if she died before turning 18, he would inherit the estate.

Neelam's premature death had to be natural, not foul play. Since he couldn't risk becoming a suspect, he sent Neelam to Bombay under the guise of higher education. He hired Julie to kill the gang and to write off Neelam's death as an accident. When Julie failed, he took the matter into his own hands. On learning the gang's plan, he went to the cottage and killed Sheetal, mistaking her for Neelam. After his testimony, the gang is exonerated. Boney recovers, and the gang gives Kailashnath his money back. Kailashnath forgives them, telling them to not to play such a rude prank with anyone.

Cast

 Akshay Kumar as Raj Malhotra
 Ayesha Jhulka as Neelam Chaudhary
 Deepak Tijori as Boney
 Sabeeha as Sheetal
 Prem Chopra as  Kailashnath
 Shakti Kapoor as Suresh Malhotra
 Tinu Anand as College Professor P.K. Mare
 Sharat Saxena as Bahadur Singh
 Anant Mahadevan as Udaychand
 Beena as Indramukhi Malhotra
 Johnny Lever as Anna Pillai
 Amrutlal Patel as Police Constable
 Kunika as Julie 
 Guddi Maruti as Vada Pav
 Dinyar Contractor as College Principal

Soundtrack
Jatin–Lalit composed the soundtrack, which featured in the top 5 best selling albums of 1992. Despite the music being a huge success, directors Abbas–Mustan never repeated Jatin–Lalit for any of their future projects. The music was released on Venus Records and Tapes (now called as Venus Worldwide Entertainment). The background music was conducted by Ramesh Iyer and Pradeep Lad.

 The songs "Vada Raha Sanam (Solo)", Hum Yaar Hain Yaaron Ke (both Happy & Sad) are not in the film.

References

External links
 

1992 films
1990s Hindi-language films
Films directed by Abbas–Mustan
Films scored by Jatin–Lalit
1992 action thriller films
Indian action thriller films
Hindi films remade in other languages
Indian thriller drama films
1990s thriller drama films
1992 drama films